Kashino is a rural locality (a village) in Komyanskoye Rural Settlement, Gryazovetsky District, Vologda Oblast, Russia. The population was 12 as of 2002.

Geography 
Kashino is located 35 km northeast of Gryazovets (the district's administrative centre) by road. Nadorozhny Lipovik is the nearest rural locality.

References 

Rural localities in Gryazovetsky District